Nicholas Comoroto (born April 22, 1991) is an American professional wrestler currently signed to All Elite Wrestling (AEW). Comoroto began his career in 2013 on the independent circuit. In 2019, he signed a development contract with WWE, but was released the next year as part of a series of budget cuts stemming from the COVID-19 pandemic, joining AEW later that year.

Early life 
Comoroto grew up in the Blackwood section of Gloucester Township, New Jersey where he attended Gloucester Catholic High School and Gloucester County College, participating in amateur wrestling at both. He went on to attend Rowan University, where he studied accounting.

Professional wrestling career

Early career (2013–2019) 
Comoroto was trained to wrestle by Q. T. Marshall at the Monster Factory in his home state of New Jersey. He wrestled his first recorded match in 2013 for the Williamstown, New Jersey-based Old Time Wrestling promotion, where he was billed as the incumbent Classic Champion. From 2014 to 2017, Comoroto competed primarily for the Paulsboro, New Jersey-based Monster Factory Pro Wrestling promotion, where he held the MFPW Heavyweight Championship on one occasion, the MFPW Live Championship on two occasions, and the MFPW Tag Team Championship on three occasions. In 2015, he teamed with Billy Damiana as "Shooterz Inc.", while in 2016, he teamed with Kyle the Beast as "Beast Cartel". In 2017 and 2018, Comoroto wrestled for a range of promotions throughout the Northeastern United States, including Ring of Honor in Philadelphia, Pennsylvania, EVOLVE in Melrose, Massachusetts, and MCW Pro Wrestling in Maryland.

WWE (2019–2020) 
In February 2019, Comoroto signed a contract with WWE, where he was assigned to its developmental brand, NXT. In March 2019, he began wrestling on NXT live events throughout Florida. In May 2019, he participated in the third annual WWE Performance Center combine, where he was the top ranked male in the velocity bench press contest. In July 2019, he was given the ring name "Nick Ogarelli". Comoroto made his final appearance with NXT in March 2020. In April 2020, he was released by WWE as part of a series of budget cuts connected with the COVID-19 pandemic.

All Elite Wrestling (2020–present) 

In October 2020, Comoroto made his first appearance with the Jacksonville, Florida-based promotion All Elite Wrestling, losing to Darby Allin on episode #56 of the web television show AEW Dark. He made multiple further appearances on AEW Dark throughout late 2020 and early 2021. In January 2021, Comoroto appeared on episode #69 of the TNT television show AEW Dynamite, losing to Jon Moxley via referee's decision. Comoroto subsequently formed an alliance with  Dustin Rhodes and Q. T. Marshall, thus joining Nightmare Family. On the March 31, 2021 episode of AEW Dynamite, Comoroto and several other students joined with Q. T. Marshall in attacking members of Nightmare Family, with Comoroto subsequently becoming part of Marshall's new stable, "The Factory" and turning heel in the process.

Professional wrestling style and persona 
Comoroto uses the nickname the "Freak Beast". His appearance has been compared to fellow wrestler Bruiser Brody. While wrestling for AEW, he adopted a gorilla press powerslam as his finishing move.

Personal life 
On December 20, 2022, Comoroto disclosed that he had attention deficit hyperactivity disorder.

Championships and accomplishments 
Monster Factory Pro Wrestling
MFPW Heavyweight Champion (1 time)
MFPW Live Champion (2 times)
MFPW Tag Team Champion (3 times) – with Billy Damiana (2 times) and Kyle the Beast (1 time)

Old Time Wrestling
OTW Classic Champion (1 time)

References

External links 
 
 
 

1991 births
21st-century professional wrestlers
All Elite Wrestling personnel
American male professional wrestlers
Gloucester Catholic High School alumni
Living people
People from Gloucester Township, New Jersey
People with attention deficit hyperactivity disorder
Professional wrestlers from New Jersey
Rowan University alumni